Plassa (also known as Scarlattino) is a red Italian wine grape variety that is grown in the Piedmont wine region of northwest Italy where it was once historically used as a table grape but now is almost always used for winemaking. Here the grape is most often used as a minor blending component adding tannins to wines made from Barbera, Neretta Cuneese, Grisa nera and Chatus.

History

The name Plassa is derived from the word pellaccia which in the local Piedmontese dialect means "hard skin" and is a reference to the very thick grape skins of Plassa berries. Ampelographers believe that the grape is native to Piedmont region where it has been historically associated with the communes of Bibiana, Bricherasio, Campiglione-Fenile, Pinerolo and San Secondo di Pinerolo in the province of Turin.

The thick skins of Plassa allowed the grape to stay fresh after harvest, making it prized as a table grape, but over time it use as a table grape wine and now it is used solely for wine production.

Viticulture
Plassa is a mid to late ripening variety that can be very vigorous producing large foliage which may require canopy management to keep in check. The variety gets its name, Scarlattino, from the bright red color that the plant stems develop during the growing season. While Plassa has good resistance to most fungal diseases, such as downy and powdery mildew, due to its very thick skins it is susceptible to the viticultural hazard of millerandage and to infection from European grapevine moths.

Wine regions

Here the grape is primarily used as a blending component, adding tannins to wines made from  Barbera, Neretta Cuneese, Grisa nera and Chatus.

Synonyms
Over the years Plassa has been known under a variety of synonyms including: Cheur dur, Cuor Duro, Palessa, Pelasina, Pelassa, Pellaccia, Pellacia, Scarlattin, Scarlattino and Scarlattino Plassa.

References

Red wine grape varieties